Step One is the debut album by British pop group Steps. It was released in the UK and Europe on 14 September 1998. The album charted at number two on the UK Albums Chart upon its release, going on to spend 64 weeks in the chart. It was beaten to number one by This Is My Truth Tell Me Yours by Manic Street Preachers, who also beat Steps' single "One for Sorrow" to number one on the UK Singles Chart with the song "If You Tolerate This Your Children Will Be Next". In February 2000, the album was re-released in the US, containing songs from both Step One and its successor, Steptacular. The tracks "5,6,7,8", "Last Thing on My Mind", "One for Sorrow", "Heartbeat" and "Better Best Forgotten" were released as the singles in UK. In 2000, the album was certified 5× Platinum by the British Phonographic Industry, and has sold over 1.4 million copies in the UK.

The album contains some covers—"Last Thing on My Mind" was originally released as a single by female pop group Bananarama, while "Love U More" was originally recorded by techno/house band Sunscreem, "Experienced" was originally recorded by boybands The Bario Boys & Worlds Apart and "Stay With Me" appears on Romeo's Daughters' self-titled début album.

"Tragedy", which was recorded for a Bee Gees tribute album, was paired up with "Heartbeat" as a double A-side single and included on the group's second album, Steptacular, but is also featured as a bonus track on some international editions of this album.

Track listing

American release
The United States version included several tracks from Steptacular, and "Better the Devil You Know", while omitting most of the album-only tracks from the UK version of Step One. In this respect, it essentially serves as a Steps "best of" compilation for their UK releases through to "Deeper Shade of Blue". The U.S. Version also has the cover from the Steptacular album.

Notably, "Better Best Forgotten" was not included on this version, while the UK version of "One for Sorrow" was omitted to include Tony Moran's remixed track.

US singles
 "One for Sorrow" (US Mix)
 "Tragedy"

Personnel

Producers:
Topham, Twigg and Waterman (for tracks 1, 2, 3, 4, 9, 10 and 13)
Frampton and Waterman (for tracks 5, 7 and 8)
Sanders, Frampton and Waterman (for track 6)
Work in Progress (W.I.P) (for tracks 11 and 13)
Sanders and Waterman (for track 12)
Engineers:
Chris McDonnell (for tracks 1, 2, 3, 4, 10 and 13)
Dan Frampton (for tracks 5 and 7)
McDonnell and Frampton (for track 8 and 9)
Jason Barron, Martin Neary and Frampton (for track 6)
Paul Waterman (for track 11)
Barron (for track 12)

Mixing:
Work in Progress (W.I.P) (for track 1)
Les Sharma (for track 3)
Paul Waterman (for tracks 2, 11 and 12)
Waterman and Dan Frampton (for 4, 5, 6 and 10)
Frampton (for tracks 7, 8 and 9)
Work in Progress (W.I.P) (for track 13)
Assistant engineers: Bradlee/Al and Pete
All tracks were recorded and mixed at the PWL Studios in London and Manchester.

Charts

Weekly charts

Year-end charts

Certifications

Release history

References

1998 debut albums
Steps (group) albums
Jive Records albums